ALAC may refer to:

 Alcohol Advisory Council of New Zealand, autonomous Crown entity for promoting alcohol moderation
 Aluminium acetate (AlAc), a number of different salts of aluminum with acetic acid
 Apple Lossless Audio Codec, an audio coding format
 Artificial Limb & Appliance Centres, facilities managed by the NHS Wales organisation Artificial Limb & Appliance Service
 At-Large Advisory Committee, an advisory committee to ICANN